Echostar 12 (E*12), also known as Cablevision-1 and Rainbow-1, is a commercial communications satellite in geosynchronous Earth orbit. It was launched on 17 July 2003, as Rainbow-1, on the third flight of the Atlas V rocket from Cape Canaveral, Florida. Its original purpose was to transmit digital television streams for the ill-fated Voom high definition direct broadcast satellite network.

Part of the A2100 series of commercial satellites, Rainbow-1 was constructed by the Lockheed Martin corporation at an approximate cost of $100 million USD, although this amount has not been verified.

EchoStar (Dish Network spin off) now owns the satellite (as it carried Voom HD Networks). The satellite was renamed Echostar 12 (or E*12) in March 2006.

EchoStar 12 is still in orbit and located at 61.5 degrees West longitude, over the Earth's Equator. It is currently being used for Dish Network HDTV television signals, transmitted using DVB, on the Ku band transponders. The satellite has lost some capability due to degradation of its solar power system.>

References

Lockheed Martin satellites and probes
Communications satellites in geostationary orbit
Satellites using the A2100 bus
E12
Spacecraft launched in 2003